Vehicle recovery is a type of military operation conducted to extricate wheeled and tracked vehicles that have become immobile due to condition of the soil, nature of terrain in general, loss of traction due to an attempt to negotiate an obstacle, having broken down, or from sustaining non-combat or combat damage. Vehicles used in military operations can be hard to extricate from sand, snow, or mud.

Vehicle recovery is part of the process known in the United States military as Recovery and Battle Damage Assessment and Repair (BDAR), known by other names in other militaries.

Levels of recovery 

There are three levels of recovery:
 Self-recovery: recovery of a vehicle by its own crew, using available tools and spare parts (known in the U.S. Army as 'basic issue items (BII)', known in Commonwealth armies as the 'common equipment schedule (CES)'), with troubleshooting procedures in manuals as instructions.
 Like-recovery: recovery of a vehicle by another vehicle of a similar or heavier weight class. Tracked vehicles are not permitted to tow wheeled vehicles, because it damages their steering.
 Dedicated recovery: recovery of a vehicle by a specialised armoured recovery vehicle (ARV).
In order to limit reliance on recovery assets such as ARVs (whose availability is limited), these levels of recovery aim to make a vehicle crew as self-sustaining as possible.

Approaches
Recovery can be performed using manual winches or motor-assisted methods of recovery, using ground or vehicle-mounted recovery equipment (mostly winches and cranes), with the recovery of heavier vehicles such as tanks conducted by armoured wheel and track recovery vehicles (ARVs). During peacetime and in non-combat settings, various recovery vehicles can be used. In combat, under enemy fire, armies typically used armoured recovery vehicles, as the armour protects the crew from small arms fire and gives some protection from artillery and heavier fire. 

Vehicle recovery can be performed by the vehicle itself, particularly if it has a powered winch, or by another like vehicle of similar weight and engine power. Many field expedients and improvised approaches for both recovery and repairs have been used by different armed forces since the wide introduction of vehicles into armed force. During the First World War, recovery vehicles tended to be re-purposed tanks. In WWII, while tanks and armoured personnel carriers were still converted into recovery vehicles, specialized, factory-built armoured recovery vehicles were introduced. This includes recovery with the use of the fifth wheel towing device or with Allied Kinetic Energy Recovery Rope (AKERR). AKERR is braided nylon rope which is designed to stretch, which makes AKERR tow ropes better able to pull stuck vehicles out of mud.
Special hand and arm signals are used during the vehicle recovery to guide the participants where field of view or line-of-sight are restricted and to make communications feasible in noisy battlefield conditions.

References

Literature 
 

Military logistics
Vehicle recycling